Richard Louis Nold (born May 4, 1943) is a former Major League Baseball pitcher who played for one season. He pitched for the Washington Senators for seven games during the 1967 Washington Senators season.

External links

1943 births
Living people
Washington Senators (1961–1971) players
City College of San Francisco Rams baseball players
Major League Baseball pitchers
Baseball players from California
Hawaii Islanders players